Baron Cooper may be:

Baron Cooper (peerage), A subsidiary title of the Earl of Shaftesbury
Thomas Cooper, 1st Baron Cooper of Culross (1892–1955), Scottish politician, judge and historian
Jack Cooper, Baron Cooper of Stockton Heath (1908–1988), British politician and trade union leader
Andrew Cooper, Baron Cooper of Windrush